Bhumibol Adulyadej Hospital Station is a BTS Skytrain station, on the Sukhumvit Line in Bangkok, Thailand. It is located in front of Bhumibol Adulyadej Hospital. The station is part of the northern extension of the Sukhumvit Line and opened on 16 December 2020, as part of phase 4.

See also 
 Bangkok Skytrain

References 

BTS Skytrain stations